The 25 August 2009 Kandahar bombing killed 43 people and injured at least 65 in Kandahar, Afghanistan. The Taliban were thought to be responsible.

A wedding hall and a dozen houses were destroyed in the explosion. The target was apparently the headquarters of a Japanese construction company.

References

External links
 Afghans pay tribute to bomb victims 
Bombing Deepens Despair in a Stricken Afghan City 

2009 murders in Afghanistan
Mass murder in 2009
Mass murder in Afghanistan
Terrorist incidents in Afghanistan in 2009
Suicide car and truck bombings in Afghanistan
History of Kandahar
August 2009 events in Asia
Attacks on buildings and structures in Afghanistan
Attacks in Afghanistan in 2009